William "Hawk" Birdshead (Cheyenne and Arapaho) is an activist who founded Indigenous Life Movement, a media organization. He works in suicide prevention.

Career 
At the 2016 Glastonbury Music Festival, he participated as one of the singers in the opening of the festival, and later performed live on the Arcadia Spider Stage with world music performers from Australia, New Zealand and Africa, participating in setting the world record for forming the largest human peace sign. Also in 2016  he toured the United Kingdom as one of the presenters of the film "Awake, A Dream From Standing Rock."

In 2017, Birdshead was a keynote speaker at the inaugural World Indigenous Suicide Prevention Conference in Rotorua, New Zealand.

References

External links  
 
 Native American Suicide Prevention Organization
 Indigenous Life Movement
 U.S. Tribes and New Zealand Indigenous Suicide Prevention

1986 births
Living people
People from Pine Ridge, South Dakota
American activists
American filmmakers
Cheyenne and Arapaho Tribes people
21st-century Native Americans
Native American activists